Stomatella callosa is a species of sea snail, a marine gastropod mollusk in the family Trochidae, the top snails.

Description
The length of the shell attains 11 mm, its diameter 7 mm. The complanate shell is ovate, elongated, transversely delicately striate and contains two whorls.  The apex is somewhat prominent. The oblong aperture is ear-shaped. Its right lip is simple, somewhat excavated in the middle. The columella is margined, strong, thickened, callous and provided with a tooth-like tubercle. The margins are continuous and joined by a callus.

Distribution
This species occurs in the Red Sea.

References

 Savigny, J-.C., 1817 Description de l'Egypte, ou recueil des observations et des recherches qui ont été faites en Egypte pendant l'expédition de l'Armée française, publié par les ordres de sa Majesté l'Empereur Napoléon le Grand. Histoire Naturelle, p. 339 pp
 Fischer, P., 1871. Diagnoses des espèces nouvelles. Journal de Conchyliologie 19: 218-219
 Vaught, K.C. (1989). A classification of the living Mollusca. American Malacologists: Melbourne, FL (USA). . XII, 195 pp
 Pallary, P. (1926). Explication des planches de J.C. Savigny. Mémoires présentés à l'Institut d'Égypte. i-viii, 1-138, pl. 1-18. Le Caire.
 Vine, P. (1986). Red Sea Invertebrates. Immel Publishing, London. 224 pp.
 Zuschin, M., Janssen, R. & Baal, C. (2009). Gastropods and their habitats from the northern Red Sea (Egypt: Safaga). Part 1: Patellogastropoda, Vetigastropoda and Cycloneritimorpha. Annalen des Naturhistorischen Museums in Wien

External links
 Blatterer H. (2019). Mollusca of the Dahab region (Gulf of Aqaba, Red Sea). Denisia. 43: 1-480

callosa
Gastropods described in 1871